The San Francisco Film Critics Circle Award for Best Cinematography is an award given by the San Francisco Film Critics Circle to honor a cinematographer who has delivered an outstanding achievement while working in the film industry.

Winners

2000s

2010s

Cinematography
Awards for best cinematography